Margaret Brennan (born 1980) is an American news correspondent.

Margaret or Maggie Brennan may also refer to:

Real people
Margaret Brennan (nun) (1831–1887), Canadian Roman Catholic nun
Margarret Brennan (Gaelic football), see Ladies' Gaelic football All Stars Awards
Maggie Brennan (actress) in Randall's Thumb
Maggie Brennan, WCBE radio host

Fictional characters
Margaret Brennan, character in  The Marriage of Bette and Boo created by Victoria Clark
Maggie Brennan, character in Creatures of Impulse
Margaret "Maggie" Brennan, character in Death (DC Comics)